Joshua Hill (January 10, 1812March 6, 1891) was an American politician who served as a United States Senator from the state of Georgia.

Early years and legal practice
Joshua Hill was born in 1812, in the Abbeville District, South Carolina to Joshua Hill, Sr. and Nancy Ann Wyatt Collier. He attended the common schools, and upon graduation took up the study of law. In 1833 Hill moved to Monticello, Georgia where he establish a law practice. Hill married Emily Reid of Monticello in 1836, she was 16 years old. They had four daughters and one son. Fifteen years later, in 1848 Hill moved to Madison, where he would maintain a residence for the rest of his life.

Political career

U.S. House of Representatives
Hill is said to have had "strong Whig and Unionist principles" which aligned him with Whig Party until that organization dissolved in Georgia. Hill then became a member of the American Party (also called the Know-Nothing Party). The Know Nothing Party in his congressional district nominated Hill (without his solicitation) to run for the United States House of Representatives from Georgia in 1857, and it was under that banner that he was elected. He was re-elected to a second term in 1859, but resigned on January 23, 1861, shortly after the state convention passed an ordinance of secession in Georgia.

Mayor of Madison, Georgia
In 1864, Hill was elected mayor of Madison, Georgia. During the later stages of the Civil War, Hill lost his only son during the Atlanta Campaign in fighting near Lithonia, Georgia. When Hill went to retrieve his son's body, he stopped to speak with General William Tecumseh Sherman, with a request that Union troops under Sherman's command  not burn the town of Madison which was on the path of Sherman's March to the Sea. While Sherman agreed, the portion of his troops passing through Madison were under the command of subordinate General Henry Warner Slocum. When General Slocum approached Madison, Joshua Hill went out to meet him. General Slocum honored the agreement previously struck with General Sherman, and only burned the cotton gin, the railroad station, and anything that contributed to the war effort, but not houses.

United States Senate
Following the end of the Civil War, Hill was elected to the United States Senate from Georgia as a Republican in 1867. However, he did not serve in the Senate until 1871 when Georgia was readmitted to the United States. He served in the Senate until the end of his term in 1873 and did not run for reelection. He resumed the practice of law and died in Madison, Georgia.

Hill became the first Republican U.S. Senator from the state of Georgia. Soon afterwards, Reconstruction ended, and Georgia would not elect another Republican to the Senate until Mack Mattingly in 1980.

Death and legacy
Hill died in Madison on March 6, 1891, with interment in Madison Cemetery. He is remembered for his congressional work, obtaining the transfer of deed of the old U.S. Mint Offices in Dahlonega, Georgia to the fledgling North Georgia Agricultural College which later evolved into the University of North Georgia.

References

External links
  Southern Living at the Joshua Hill house in Madison, Georgia 
 

1812 births
1891 deaths
People from Abbeville County, South Carolina
Know-Nothing members of the United States House of Representatives from Georgia (U.S. state)
Opposition Party members of the United States House of Representatives from Georgia (U.S. state)
Republican Party United States senators from Georgia (U.S. state)
Georgia (U.S. state) Know Nothings
Georgia (U.S. state) Oppositionists
People from Madison, Georgia
American slave owners
Mayors of places in Georgia (U.S. state)
Republican Party members of the United States House of Representatives from Georgia (U.S. state)
United States senators who owned slaves